An opioidergic agent (or drug) is a chemical which functions to directly modulate the opioid neuropeptide systems (i.e., endorphin, enkephalin, dynorphin, nociceptin) in the body or brain. Examples include opioid analgesics such as morphine and opioid antagonists such as naloxone. Opioidergics also comprise allosteric modulators and enzyme affecting agents like enkephalinase inhibitors.

Allosteric modulators

 BMS-986121: μ-PAM
 BMS-986122: μ-PAM
 Ignavine
 Oxytocin: μ-PAM 
 δ-PAM (see reference)
 Cannabidiol
 Tetrahydrocannabinol
 Sodium (Na+)

See also

 List of opioids
 Adenosinergic
 Adrenergic
 Cannabinoidergic
 Cholinergic
 Dopaminergic
 GABAergic
 Glycinergic
 Histaminergic
 Melatonergic
 Monoaminergic
 Serotonergic

References

Neurochemistry
Neurotransmitters
Opioids